Joseph Straus (born 1938 in Trieste, Italy) is professor of intellectual property law, former director of the Max Planck Institute for Intellectual Property, Competition and Tax Law, Munich, Germany, and Chairman of the Managing Board of the Munich Intellectual Property Law Center (MIPLC). According to the Intellectual Asset Management magazine, he is "one of the world's most influential patent scholars." He is member and dean of the Class "Social Sciences, Law and Economics" of the European Academy of Sciences and Arts.

References and notes

External links
 Joseph Straus at the Max Planck Institute for Intellectual Property, Competition and Tax Law
 Joseph Straus at the Munich Intellectual Property Law Center (MIPLC)

1938 births
Living people
Writers from Trieste
Commanders Crosses of the Order of Merit of the Federal Republic of Germany
Members of the European Academy of Sciences and Arts
Patent law scholars
Max Planck Institute directors